Canadian Utilities Limited is a member of the ATCO Group of companies. Canadian Utilities Limited is a Canada-based worldwide organization of companies with assets of approximately $7.3 billion and more than 6,500 employees in three main business divisions: power generation, utilities (natural gas and electricity transmission and distribution), and global enterprises (technology, logistics, and energy services).

References 

Companies listed on the Toronto Stock Exchange
Electric power companies of Canada
ATCO